A brain transplant or whole-body transplant is a procedure in which the brain of one organism is transplanted into the body of another organism. It is a procedure distinct from head transplantation, which involves transferring the entire head to a new body, as opposed to the brain only. Theoretically, a person with complete organ failure could be given a new and functional body while keeping their own personality, memories, and consciousness through such a procedure. Neurosurgeon Robert J. White has grafted the head of a monkey onto the headless body of another monkey. EEG readings showed the brain was later functioning normally. Initially, it was thought to prove that the brain was an immunologically privileged organ, as the host's immune system did not attack it at first, but immunorejection caused the monkey to die after nine days. Brain transplants and similar concepts have also been explored in various forms of science fiction.

Existing challenges 
One of the most significant barriers to the procedure is the inability of nerve tissue to heal properly; scarred nerve tissue does not transmit signals well, which is why a spinal cord injury is so devastating.

Alternatively, a brain–computer interface can be used connecting the subject to their own body. A study using a monkey as a subject shows that it is possible to directly use commands from the brain, bypass the spinal cord and enable hand function. An advantage is that this interface can be adjusted after the surgical interventions are done where nerves can not be reconnected without surgery.

Also, for the procedure to be practical, the age of the donated body must be close to that of the recipient brain: an adult brain cannot fit into a skull that has not reached its full growth, which occurs at age 9–12 years.

When organs are transplanted, aggressive transplant rejection by the host's immune system can occur. Because immune cells of the CNS contribute to the maintenance of neurogenesis and spatial learning abilities in adulthood, the brain has been hypothesized to be an immunologically privileged (unrejectable) organ. However, immunorejection of a functional transplanted brain has been reported in monkeys.

Partial brain transplant 

In 1982, Dr. Dorothy T. Krieger, chief of endocrinology at Mount Sinai Medical Center in New York City, achieved success with a partial brain transplant in mice.

In 1998, a team of surgeons from the University of Pittsburgh Medical Center attempted to transplant a group of brain cells to Alma Cerasini, who had suffered a severe stroke that caused the loss of mobility in her right limbs as well as had limited speech. The team hoped that the cells would correct the listed damage.

In science fiction 

The whole-body transplant is just one of several means of putting a consciousness into a new body that have been explored in science fiction.

In the film Get Out (2017), written and directed by Jordan Peele, a White woman (Allison Williams) lures her Black boyfriend (Daniel Kaluuya) to her family's estate to be auctioned off for a brain transplant procedure that enables older White people to obtain pseudo-immortality in a Black person's body. 

In Maxwell Atoms' Cartoon Network series Evil Con Carne (2003–2004), Hector Con Carne was reduced to a brain and a stomach and both of them were put in jars attached to the body of a Russian circus bear. Hector's brain is the main character of the cartoon.

Edgar Rice Burroughs' The Mastermind of Mars involves a surgeon who does this as his main operation, and a man from Earth, the narrator and main character, who is trained to do it as well.

In Neil R. Jones Professeur Jameson stories (1931), the main character is the last earthman, whose brain is saved by some alien cyborgs called the Zoromes, and is inserted into a robotic body, making him immortal.

Robert Heinlein's 1970 science fiction novel, I Will Fear No Evil, features a main character named Johann Sebastian Bach Smith whose entire brain is transplanted into his deceased secretary's skull.

In the horror film The Skeleton Key, the protagonist, Caroline, discovers that the old couple she is looking after are poor Voodoo witch doctors who stole the bodies of two young, privileged children in their care using a ritual which allows a soul to swap bodies. Unfortunately the evil old couple also trick Caroline and their lawyer into the same procedure, and both end up stuck in old dying bodies unable to speak while the witch doctors walk off with their young bodies.

In Anne Rice's The Tale of the Body Thief, the vampire Lestat discovers a man, Raglan James, who can will himself into another person's body.  Lestat demands that the procedure be used on him to allow him to be human once again, but soon finds that he has made an error and is forced to recapture James in his vampiric form so he can take his body back.

In JoJo's Bizarre Adventure (Part 3 - Stardust Crusaders), Dio Brando, a vampire who was the main antagonist in the first part of JJBA, comes back from his 100 year sleep with his new body of Jonathan Joestar. He was only left with his head so he took body of Jonathan from the neck down.

In Matthew Broughton’s BBC radio drama thriller Tracks - Origins, the protagonist Helen Ash discovers that many of the victims in a plane crash which she witnessed have vital organs missing or deficient, including the brain. She goes on to uncover her estranged father’s murky and secretive past and her own connection.

In the horror game SOMA, the protagonist has his brain scanned in extreme detail for medical purposes, however, the data from the scan is used over a century later and transferred into an artificial body. Effectively performing a consciousness transplant. Later in the story, the protagonist comes across many other cases of a similar event, with far worse results in terms of body choice for the transplanted consciousnesses. The Protagonist's goal revolves around ensuring that an artificial world called the "ARK" is as safe as possible. The ARK is a supercomputer, a server hosting a virtual world, which can be explored with one's consciousness alone. Many people, including the protagonist, have had their brains scanned and consciousnesses "transplanted" into the computer, so that they may live on, since Earth is no longer habitable in SOMA's story.

Similar in many ways to this is the idea of mind uploading, promoted by Marvin Minsky and others with a mechanistic view of natural intelligence and an optimistic outlook regarding artificial intelligence.  It is also a goal of Raëlism, a small cult based in Florida, France, and Quebec.  While the ultimate goal of transplanting is transfer of the brain to a new body optimized for it by genetics, proteomics, and/or other medical procedures, in uploading the brain itself moves nowhere and may even be physically destroyed or discarded; the goal is rather to duplicate the information patterns contained within the brain.

Another similar literary theme, though different from either procedure described above, is the transplanting of a human brain into an artificial, usually robotic, body.  Examples of this include: Caprica; Ghost in the Shell; RoboCop; the DC Comics superhero Robotman; the Cybermen from the Doctor Who television series; the cymeks in the Legends of Dune series; or full-body cyborgs in many manga or works in the cyberpunk genre.  In one episode of Star Trek, Spock's Brain is stolen and installed in a large computer-like structure; and in "I, Mudd" Uhura is offered immortality in an android body. The novel Harvest of Stars by Poul Anderson features many central characters who undergo such transplants, and deals with the difficult decisions facing a human contemplating such a procedure. In the Star Wars expanded universe the shadow droids were created by taking the brains of grievously wounded TIE fighter pilot aces. After surgically transplanting them into a protective cocoon filled with nutrient fluids, they were surgically connected to cybernetic hardware that gave them external sensors, flight control, and tactical computers that augmented their reflexes beyond the biological limit, at the cost of their humanity. Emperor Palpatine also imbued them with the dark side giving them a sixth sense, and making them into extensions of his own will.

See also 
 Cyborgs in fiction (for stories of brains transplanted into wholly artificial bodies)
 Donovan's Brain
 Isolated brain
 Robotics
 Robert J. White

References

External links 
Dr Robert White, profile by David Bennun in The Sunday Telegraph Magazine, 2000

Organ transplantation
Emerging technologies
Neurosurgery